Outlanders is a long-running series of science-fiction novels created by Mark Ellis and published by Gold Eagle, an imprint of Harlequin Enterprises.

Plot 
Set in the same fictional universe as The Trader and Deathlands but separated by a century, Outlanders follows the adventures of a core group of explorers—Kane, Grant, Brigid Baptiste, and Domi—who operate out of a secret military base known as the Cerberus Redoubt. 

Although The Trader, Deathlands, and Outlanders all bear the "James Axler" byline, Outlanders is primarily (although not exclusively) written by its creator Mark Ellis whereas multiple authors produce Deathlands.

Two hundred years after a nuclear holocaust devastated the Earth, the chaos and barbarism depicted in The Trader and Deathlands have given way to a centralized, despotic government ruled by nine mysterious barons.

Material taken from redoubts, secret preholocaust military installations with stores of weapons and the home of the gateways, mat-trans (matter-transfer) devices, supplied the baronial rule in what was known as the “Program of Unification.”

Rearmed from redoubt stockpiles, the barons consolidated their power and reclaimed very advanced technology created two centuries before by the so-called “Totality Concept.”

Their power bolstered by the invisible authority known only to an elite few as the Archon Directorate extended beyond the fortified city-states into what came to be called the Outlands. There, the rootstock of humanity survived, eking out an existence in hellzones and hounded by black-armored Magistrates, the enforcers of the barons’ laws.

When Cobaltville Magistrates Kane and Grant came across a piece of misplaced technology and Brigid Baptiste, an archivist began an investigation on their behalf, they found themselves branded as seditionists, their citizenship stripped from them and they were reclassified as Outlanders.

Since 1997’s Exile to Hell, the first book in the series, the heroes and heroines of Outlanders slowly uncovered the truth behind the barons, the Archons and the nuclear holocaust and finally the hidden history of humanity. 

They learn that Earth and humankind has been influenced since the dawn of time by the reptilian Anunnaki and the Tuatha Dé Danann. They realize that the baronies are a revival of the god-king system of ancient Sumeria.

Besides the nine barons, other threats arise in the early books, namely Sindri, a brilliant but deranged dwarf who rules a secret colony on Mars. First appearing in Parallax Red (1998), Sindri becomes the most persistent foe of the Cerberus warriors, appearing in several novels. 

Other recurring enemies include Colonel Thrush, Sam the Imperator, Grigori Zakat and Maccan, the last prince of the Tuatha Dé Danann. 

In Shadow Scourge (2000), the heroes contend with Ocajinik, apparently one of H. P. Lovecraft’s Old Ones.

In Children of the Serpent (2005), the Cerberus warriors discover that the nuclear holocaust and the institution of the baronies were part of an ancient plan formulated over a thousand years before by Enlil, the last Anunnaki on Earth in order to reincarnate the pantheon of Sumerian gods and re-establish their rule over the world.

The reincarnated Enlil becomes the Outlanders' main villain. He is considerably more evil and powerful than any of the barons, and has much of the knowledge and technology of the Anunnaki. 

Employing conspiracy theories and myths from all cultures as underpinnings, 'Outlanders' quickly distanced itself from the survivalist tone of 'Deathlands' and struck out in new directions, providing explanations and a backstory for many of the unresolved science-fiction elements in the earlier series.

Series History 
According to series creator Mark Ellis, Outlanders was not originally conceived as having any connection whatsoever to Deathlands. The link between the two series came after all the other elements had been envisioned and was suggested by Ellis who had already authored several novels in the Deathlands series.
  
The “Axlerverse,” a term coined by Mark Ellis, is inclusive of events in both Outlanders and Deathlands—however, there is very little in the way of a cohesive fictional universe in the latter series.
 
Deathlands did not develop much depth in the way of setting and Ellis introduced many new concepts to make the Axlerverse into a plausible fictional world, particularly important in the books published post-2001. 

Outlanders has established a reputation for featuring strong yet sexy female characters both in the books and on the covers, particularly those produced by artist Cliff Nielsen.

Other writers who have contributed to Outlanders are Mel Odom and Victor Milán.

Outlanders is also available on audio up to #55: Distortion Offensive, through a company named Graphic Audio.

References

External links 
 Official site of Mark Ellis
 Mark Ellis interviewed
 JamesAxler.com Fan site of the Outlanders and Deathlands series

Science fiction book series
Fantasy worlds
Ancient Egypt in fiction
Dystopian fiction
Dystopian literature
Harlequin books